The Aleutian Islands (“Land of the Aleuts”, possibly from Chukchi aliat, "island"), also called the Aleut Islands or Aleutic Islands and known before 1867 as the Catherine Archipelago, are a chain of 14 large volcanic islands and 55 smaller islands. Most of the Aleutian Islands belong to the U.S. state of Alaska, but some belong to the Russian federal subject of Kamchatka Krai. They form part of the Aleutian Arc in the Northern Pacific Ocean, occupying a land area of 6,821 sq mi (17,666 km2) and extending about  westward from the Alaska Peninsula toward the Kamchatka Peninsula in Russia, and act as a border between the Bering Sea to the north and the Pacific Ocean to the south. Crossing longitude 180°, at which point east and west longitude end, the archipelago contains both the westernmost part of the United States by longitude (Amatignak Island) and the easternmost by longitude (Semisopochnoi Island). The westernmost U.S. island in real terms, however, is Attu Island, west of which runs the International Date Line. While nearly all the archipelago is part of Alaska and is usually considered as being in the "Alaskan Bush", at the extreme western end, the small, geologically related Commander Islands belong to Russia.

The islands, with their 57 volcanoes, form the northernmost part of the Pacific Ring of Fire. Physiographically, they are a distinct section of the larger Pacific Border province, which in turn is part of the larger Pacific Mountain System physiographic division. The islands are considered to be among the most geographically isolated areas in the North Pacific.

Battles and skirmishes occurred on the islands during the Aleutian Islands campaign of World War II. The Japanese landing and occupation of Kiska and Attu in June 1942 were the only two invasions of the United States during that war.

Geology
Motion between the Kula Plate and the North American Plate along the margin of the Bering Shelf (in the Bering Sea north of the Aleutian arc) ended in the early Eocene. The Aleutian Basin, the ocean floor north of the Aleutian arc, is the remainder of the Kula Plate that was trapped when volcanism and subduction jumped south to its current location at  56 Ma.
The Aleutian island arc, then, formed in the Early Eocene (55–50 ) when the subduction of the Pacific Plate under the North American Plate began. The arc is made of separate blocks that have been rotated clockwise. The basement underlying the islands is made of three stratigraphic units: an Eocene layer of volcanic rock, an Oligocene—Miocene layer of marine sedimentary rock, and a Pliocene—Quaternary layer of sedimentary and igneous rock.

Geography

The islands, known before 1867 as the Catherine Archipelago, include six groups (east to west)
Fox Islands (the main islands are Unimak, Akutan, Unalaska and Umnak)
Islands of Four Mountains (the main islands are Yunaska and Chuginadak)
Andreanof Islands (the main islands are Adak, Atka, Amlia, Seguam, Kanaga and Tanaga)
Rat Islands (the main islands are Kiska and Amchitka)
Near Islands (the main islands are Attu Island, Agattu Island and the Semichi Islands - Alaid, Nizki and Shemya)
Commander Islands (the main islands are Bering and Medny)

All six are located between 51° and 55° N latitude and 172° E and 163° W longitude. The largest islands in the Aleutians are Attu (the farthest from the mainland), and Unalaska, Umnak, and Unimak in the Fox Islands. The largest of those is Unimak Island, with an area of 1,571.41 mi2 (4,069.9 km2), followed by Unalaska Island, the only other Aleutian Island with an area over 1,000 square miles (2,600 km2).

The axis of the archipelago near the mainland of Alaska has a southwest trend, but at Tanaga Island (about 178° W) its direction changes to the northwest. This change of direction corresponds to a curve in the line of volcanic fissures that have contributed their products to the building of the islands. Such curved chains are repeated about the Pacific Ocean in the Kuril Islands, the Japanese chain, and in the Philippines. All these island arcs are at the edge of the Pacific Plate and experience much seismic activity, but are still habitable; the Aleutians lie between the Pacific and North American tectonic plates. The general elevation is greatest in the eastern islands and least in the western. The island chain is a western continuation of the Aleutian Range on the mainland.

The great majority of the islands bear evident marks of volcanic origin, and there are numerous volcanic cones on the north side of the chain, some of them active; many of the islands, however, are not wholly volcanic, but contain crystalline or sedimentary rocks, and also amber and beds of lignite. The coasts are rocky and surf-worn, and the approaches are exceedingly dangerous, the land rising immediately from the coasts to steep, bold mountains.

Makushin Volcano on Unalaska Island, is not quite visible from within the town of Unalaska, though the steam rising from its cone is visible on a (rare) clear day. Residents of Unalaska need only to climb one of the smaller hills in the area, such as Pyramid Peak or Mt. Newhall, to get a good look at the snow-covered cone.

In 1906, a new volcanic cone rose between the islets of Bogoslof and Grewingk, near Unalaska, followed by another in 1907. These cones were nearly demolished by an explosive eruption on September 1, 1907. In 2017, the volcanic cone erupted sending ash and ice particles 30,000 feet (9000 m) into the air.

Alfred Russel Wallace's 1879 book Australasia, Ian Todd's  1974 book Island Realm: A Pacific Panorama and Dean Kohlhoff's 2002 book Amchitka and the Bomb: Nuclear Testing in Alaska all associate the Aleutian Islands with the Oceania region due to their status as remote islands in the Pacific. The islands, having biogeographical and ethnocultural affinities to North America, are not ordinarily considered a part of the region.

Climate
The climate of the islands is oceanic, with moderate and fairly uniform temperatures and heavy rainfall. Fogs are almost constant. Summer weather is much cooler than Southeast Alaska (around Sitka), but the winter temperature of the islands and of the Alaska Panhandle is very nearly the same. To the northeast of that point, the climate becomes "Subarctic With Cool Summers And Year Around Rainfall" (type "Dfc" as are Petropavlovsk-Kamchatsky, Murmansk, St. Moritz, and Labrador City), where it is similar but colder, with the coldest month averaging below . During the winter the islands become the center for a semi-permanent low-pressure area called the Aleutian Low.

The mean annual temperature for Unalaska, the most populated island of the group, is about 38 °F (3 °C), being about 30 °F (−1 °C) in January and about 52 °F (11 °C) in August. The highest and lowest temperatures recorded on the islands are 78 °F (26 °C) and 5 °F (−15 °C) respectively.

Flora

The growing season lasts approximately 135 days, from early in May until late in September, but agriculture is limited to the raising of few vegetables. With the exception of some stunted willows, the vast majority of the chain is devoid of native trees. On some of the islands, such as Adak and Amaknak, there are a few coniferous trees growing, remnants of the Russian period. This is because the islands, much like the Falklands and other islands of similar latitudes, experience such strong winds that taller trees are vulnerable to snapping off.

Instead of trees, the islands are covered with a luxuriant, dense growth of herbage and shrubs, including crowberry, bluejoint, grasses, sedges, and many flowering plants. There are areas of peat bog near the coasts. Endemic plants include the endangered Aleutian shield fern.

Fauna
The Aleutians are home to many large colonies of seabirds. Buldir Island has 21 breeding seabird species, including the Bering Sea-endemic red-legged kittiwake. Large seabird colonies are also present at Kiska, Gareloi, Semisopochnoi, Bogoslof, and others. The islands are also frequented by vagrant Asiatic birds, including the common rosefinch, Siberian rubythroat, bluethroat, lanceolated warbler, and the first North American record of the intermediate egret.

The habitats of the Aleutians are largely unspoiled, but wildlife is affected by competition from introduced species such as cattle, caribou, and foxes. Nearly all of the Aleutians are protected as part of the Alaska Maritime National Wildlife Refuge and the Aleutian Islands Wilderness.

Observations have identified sea otters as a keystone species along the coasts of many of the Aleutian Islands. Their presence encourages the growth of kelp forests, as the otters control sea urchin populations (as large populations of sea urchins can create urchin barrens by clearing away kelp stands).

Economy
On the less mountainous islands, the raising of sheep and reindeer was once believed to be practicable. There are bison on islands near Sand Point. Sheep raising seems to have died off with the advent of synthetic fibers, which lowered the value of wool. During the 1980s, there were some llama being raised on Unalaska. The current economy is primarily based on fishing, and the presence of U.S. military. The only crop is potato. Chickens are raised in barns under protection from the cold.

Transportation
In addition to a partial air service and a ferry service, the Alaska Marine Highway passes through many of the U.S. islands.

Demographics
The native people refer to themselves as Unangan, and are now generally known by most non-natives as the "Aleut". The Aleut language is one of the two main branches of the Eskimo–Aleut language family. This family is not known to be related to any others. The 2000 U.S. Census recorded a population of 8,162 on the islands, of whom 4,283 were living in the main settlement of Unalaska.

History

Prehistory
As they stretch like a broken bridge from the continent Asia to the continent North America, many anthropologists hypothesize they were a route of the first human occupants of the Americas. However, the earliest known evidence in public recorded history of human occupation in the Americas is found much farther south. The early human sites in the Bering Sea have probably been submerged by rising waters and sand during the current interglacial period. People living in or on the Aleutian Islands developed fine skills in hunting, fishing, and basketry. Hunters made their weapons, watercraft. The baskets found are noted for being finely woven with carefully shredded stalks of beach rye.

Russian period
Explorers, traders and missionaries arrived from Russia beginning in 1741.

In 1741 the Russian government sent Vitus Bering, a Dane in the service of Russia, and Aleksei Chirikov, a Russian, in the ships Saint Peter and Saint Paul on a voyage of discovery in the Northern Pacific. After the ships were separated by a storm; Chirikov discovered several eastern islands of the Aleutian group, and Bering discovered several of the western islands. Bering was shipwrecked and died in the Komandorski Islands (Commander Islands); one of which now bears his name (Bering Island), along with the surrounding Bering Sea. The survivors of Bering's party reached the Kamchatka Peninsula in a boat constructed from the wreckage of their ship, and reported the islands were rich in fur-bearing animals.

Siberian fur hunters flocked to the Commander Islands and gradually moved eastward across the Aleutian Islands to the mainland. In this manner, Russia gained a foothold on the northwestern coast of North America. The Aleutian Islands consequently belonged to Russia, until that country transferred all its possessions in North America to the U.S. in 1867.

During the consolidation of the Russian-American Company there was sporadic conflict with the native population (frequently disastrous to the poorly armed and vastly outnumbered Russians). The colonies soon entered a relatively stable state based on cooperation, intermarriage, and official policies that provided social status, education, and professional training to children of mixed Aleut-Russian birth. Within a generation, the day-to-day administration of the Russian-American colonies was largely in the hands of native-born Alaskans. Reversing the usual trend in colonization where indigenous technologies are replaced, the Russians adopted the Aleut kayak, or baidarka, sea otter hunting techniques, and the working of native copper deposits. The Russians instituted public education, preservation of the Aleut language through transliteration of religious and other texts into Aleut via an adaptation of the Cyrillic alphabet, vaccination of the native population against smallpox, and science-based sea mammal conservation policies that were ahead of their time.

By 1760 the Russian merchant Andrian Tolstykh had made a detailed census in the vicinity of Adak and extended Russian citizenship to the Aleuts.

During his third and last voyage in 1778, Captain James Cook surveyed the eastern portion of the Aleutian archipelago, accurately determined the position of some of the more important islands, and corrected many errors of former navigators.

Orthodox Christian heritage
Among the first Christian missionaries to arrive in the Aleutian Islands was a party of ten Russian Orthodox monks and priests, who arrived in 1793. Within two years, a monk named Herman was the only survivor of that party. He settled on Spruce Island, near Kodiak Island, and often defended the rights of the Aleuts against the Russian trading companies. He is now known in the Orthodox Church as Saint Herman of Alaska.

Another early Christian missionary of the Russian Orthodox Church was Father Veniaminov who arrived in Unalaska in 1824. He was named Bishop Innokentii in 1840 and moved to Sitka. He is now known in the Orthodox Church as Saint Innocent of Alaska.

The principal settlements were on Unalaska Island. The oldest was Iliuliuk (also called Unalaska), settled in 1760–1775, with a customs house and an Orthodox church.

U.S. possession
Western Aleutian Islands, from a 1916 map of the Alaska Territory

After the American purchase of Alaska from Russia in 1867, further development took place. New buildings included a Methodist mission and orphanage, and the headquarters for a considerable fleet of United States revenue cutters, which patrolled the sealing grounds of the Pribilof Islands. The first public school in Unalaska opened in 1883.

The U.S. Congress extended American citizenship to all Native Americans (and this law has been held to include the indigenous peoples of Alaska) in 1924. A hospital was built in Unalaska in 1933 by the U.S. Bureau of Indian Affairs.

World War II

During World War II, in what were the only two invasions of the United States during the war, small parts of the Aleutian islands were occupied by Japanese forces, when Attu and Kiska were invaded possibly to divert American forces away from the main Japanese attack at Midway Atoll. The U.S. Navy, having broken the Japanese naval codes, proceeded as if this was just a diversion, and it did not expend large amounts of effort in defending the islands. More than 90 Americans were taken to Japan as prisoners of war. Most of the civilian population (over 800) of the Aleutians and Pribilovians were detained by the United States in camps in the Alaska Panhandle. During the Aleutian Islands campaign, American forces invaded Japanese-held Attu and defeated the Japanese. American and Canadian troops later launched an invasion of Kiska, 34,426 men composed of both Americans and Canadian participated however Japanese forces had already withdrawn, ending the campaign in the islands. The invasion was an embarrassment for the Allied forces as the entire Japanese force of 5,183 men had left the island on July 28 without the Americans noticing. However, the Americans suffered significant casualties during their 'invasion' – 313 men died as a result of accidents, with many dying due to accidental fire.

President Roosevelt visited Adak in 1944, meeting with commanders and eating with soldiers of the garrison. This was his first and only trip to the Aleutian Islands and Alaska as a whole. A rumor spread that FDR had accidentally left his Scottish Terrier "Fala" on one of the Islands and had to send a destroyer to retrieve the dog, costing taxpayers several million dollars. The President made fun of these rumors during a talk with the Teamsters Union in Washington DC, now known as the "Fala Speech". At this speech the President joked with the crowd saying, "Well, of course, I don't resent attacks, and my family doesn't resent attacks, but Fala does resent them!"

June 3, 2002 was celebrated as Dutch Harbor Remembrance Day. The governor of Alaska ordered state flags lowered to half-staff to honor the 43 Americans who died during the two-day Japanese air attack in 1942. The Aleutian World War II National Historic Area Visitors Center opened that month.

Recent developments
The Alaska Native Claims Settlement Act became law in 1971. In 1977, the Ounalashka Corporation (from Unalaska) declared a dividend. This was the first village corporation to declare and pay a dividend to its shareholders.

The Aleutian Islands were designated a UNESCO biosphere reserve in 1976. The Aleutians were one of 17 biosphere reserves in the United States withdrawn by request of the U.S. government from the programme in June 2017.

Nuclear testing

The U.S. conducted underground tests of nuclear weapons on Amchitka Island from 1965 to 1971 as part of the Vela Uniform program. The final detonation, the Cannikin, was the largest underground nuclear explosion by the U.S.

Russian Aleutians

Russian Aleutians is organized as Aleutsky District in Kamchatka Krai. It comprises
 Commander Islands
 Bering Island
 Medny Island
 Sea Lion Rock 
 Sea Otter Rocks
 Tufted Puffin Rock (Kamen Toporkov or Ostrov Toporkov)
 Kamen Ariy

See also

1946 Aleutian Islands earthquake
2014 Aleutian Islands earthquake
Aleutian Islands Campaign
Aleutians East Borough, Alaska
Aleutians West Census Area, Alaska
List of Aleutian Island volcanoes
List of Aleutian Islands
List of birds of Aleutian Islands
List of extreme points of the United States
Lists of islands
Maritime fur trade
Military history of the Aleutian Islands
Peter the Aleut

References

Further reading

 Gibson, Daniel D., and G. Vernon Byrd. Birds of the Aleutian Islands, Alaska. Cambridge, Massachusetts: Nuttall Ornithological Club, 2007. 
 Ivanov, Viacheslav Vsevolodovich. The Russian Orthodox Church of Alaska and the Aleutian Islands and Its Relation to Native American Traditions—An Attempt at a Multicultural Society, 1794–1912. Washington, DC: Library of Congress, 1997. 
 Jochelson, Waldemar. Archaeological Investigations in the Aleutian Islands. Washington: Carnegie Institution of Washington, 1925.

External links

U.S. Coast Pilot 9, Chapter 7, Aleutian Islands
 
Seattle to Aleutian Island Expedition

 
Archipelagoes of Alaska
Archipelagoes of Russia
Archipelagoes of the Pacific Ocean
Former biosphere reserves of the United States
Islands of the Bering Sea
Islands of the Russian Far East
Physiographic sections
Regions of Alaska
Temperate Northern Pacific
Tundra ecoregions
Volcanic arc islands
Volcanoes of Alaska
Volcanoes of the Pacific Ocean